Basic Research in Cardiology is a peer-reviewed scientific journal that was established in 1973 by Springer Berlin Heidelberg.

Abstracting and indexing 
Basic Research in Cardiology is abstracted and indexed the following bibliographic databases:
Science Citation Index Expanded
Scopus
BIOSIS
EMBASE
MEDLINE

According to the Journal Citation Reports, the journal has a 2020 impact factor of 17.165.

References

External links 
 

Cardiology journals
English-language journals
Publications established in 1973